ORP Ślązak (Polish for Silesian) was a World War II . Initially laid down in 1940 for the Royal Navy as HMS Bedale, in 1942 she was commissioned by the Polish Navy.

After World War II, she was leased to the Indian Navy in 1953, where she served as a training ship until 1976. She was scrapped in 1979.

History as ORP Ślązak
Ślazak was commissioned on 17 April 1942. During the Second World War she took part in 32 patrols and escorted 104 convoys. Ślązak was one of eight Hunt-class ships that took part in the Dieppe Raid. At Dieppe she saved 85 soldiers of the Royal Regiment of Canada, trapped at the beach after landing. During the invasion of Normandy she was supporting the landing at Sword. She was the lead destroyer for the lead flotilla of minesweepers that morning, which was symbolic because the invasion of Poland by German forces had initiated the conflict. As a convoy escort her crew shot down five enemy aircraft (and possibly three more).

After the war she was decommissioned in 1946 and transferred back to the Royal Navy.

History as INS Godavari

HMS Bedale was leased to the Indian Navy in 1952. She underwent a refit by the Cammell Laird shipyard at Birkenhead, and was commissioned as INS Godavari on 27 April 1953. In April 1959, the lease was converted into a sale. Along with INS Gomati and INS Ganga she formed part of the 22nd Destroyer squadron.

She served as a training ship until 23 March 1976 when she ran aground in the Maldives and was damaged beyond repair. INS Godavari was eventually scrapped in 1979.

References

Publications

English, John (1987). The Hunts: a history of the design, development and careers of the 86 destroyers of this class built for the Royal and Allied Navies during World War II. England: World Ship Society. . 

Hunt-class destroyers of the Royal Navy
Ships built on the River Tyne
1941 ships
World War II destroyers of the United Kingdom
Hunt-class destroyers of the Polish Navy
World War II destroyers of Poland
Operation Overlord
Maritime incidents in 1976